Mont Forel is a mountain in King Christian IX Land, Sermersooq Municipality, Greenland. It is part of the Schweizerland range, also known as 'Schweizerland Alps'.
 
This peak is located in a popular climbing destination, together with the Watkins Range to the northeast and the Stauning Alps further north.

History
The mountain was named in 1912 by Swiss geophysicist and Arctic explorer Alfred de Quervain after his Greenland icecap crossing from Godhavn (Qeqertarsuaq) on the west, to Sermilik Fjord on the eastern side.

Mont Forel was first climbed by a Swiss expedition of the Akademischer Alpen-Club of Zürich led by André Roch in 1938.

Geography
Mont Forel is the highest peak outside of the area of the Watkins Range, where the highest mountain, Gunnbjørn Fjeld, rises. It is located just north of the Arctic Circle in the Schweizerland Alps, north of Sermilik, near Ammassalik Island. The Crown Prince Frederick Range stretches northeastwards to the northeast of Mont Forel.

See also
List of mountain peaks of Greenland
List of mountains in Greenland

References

External links
The Swiss Expedition to Greenland 1938. André Roch
 Pictures from a 2003 expedition(In French)

Forel